Eurofruit (full title Eurofruit Magazine) is a monthly global trade marketing magazine for the European fresh fruit and vegetable sector.

History and profile
Eurofruit was founded in 1992. The publication is aimed at buyers, exporters, importers, distributors and producers of fresh produce, be it sold in Europe or exported from it. The magazine is published from London. It also has two sister titles, Asiafruit Magazine (based in Melbourne) and Americafruit Magazine (London), which are aimed at the Asian import-export market and the North American import market respectively. The publisher of these magazines is Market Intelligence Ltd.

References

External links
 Official website
 WorldCat Record

Agriculture in Europe
Business magazines published in the United Kingdom
Food and drink magazines
Monthly magazines published in the United Kingdom
Magazines published in London
Magazines established in 1992
Professional and trade magazines